In cryptography, WAKE is a stream cipher designed by David Wheeler in 1993.

WAKE stands for Word Auto Key Encryption. The cipher works in cipher feedback mode, generating keystream blocks from previous ciphertext blocks. WAKE uses an S-box with 256 entries of 32-bit words.

The cipher is fast, but vulnerable to chosen plaintext and chosen ciphertext attacks.

See also
 TEA, XTEA

References

External links 
A Bulk Data Encryption Algorithm

Stream ciphers